Grávalos is a village in the province and autonomous community of La Rioja, Spain. It's 72 km. from the city of Logroño.
Traditional tales talk about Gravalos like belong to Arnedo.
It was in first times a Roman villa. In medieval ages belonged to Arnedo until 1669. In that year Gravalos become an independent municipality, but still remained as a possession of the Arnedo's Church.

References

Interesting places 
 Parish church of Santa María de la Antigua, 16th-century,  Three naves of different altitude.

Populated places in La Rioja (Spain)